Tympanoplasty is the surgical operation performed to reconstruct hearing mechanism of middle ear.

Classification
Tympanoplasty is classified into five different types, originally described by Horst Ludwig Wullstein (1906–1987) in 1956.
 Type 1 involves repair of the tympanic membrane alone, when the middle ear is normal. A type 1 tympanoplasty is synonymous to myringoplasty.
 Type 2 involves repair of the tympanic membrane and middle ear in spite of slight defects in the middle ear ossicles.
 Type 3 involves removal of ossicles and epitympanum when there are large defects of the malleus and incus. The tympanic membrane is repaired and directly connected to the head of the stapes.
 Type 4 describes a repair when the stapes foot plate is movable, but the crura are missing. The resulting middle ear will only consist of the Eustachian tube and hypotympanum.
 Type 5 is a repair involving a fixed stapes footplate. Also called fenestration operation.

Myringoplasty

The term 'myringoplasty' refers to repair of the tympanic membrane alone. There are several options for treating a perforated eardrum. If the perforation is from recent trauma, many ear, nose and throat specialists will elect to watch and see if it heals on its own. After that, surgery may be considered.

Ossicular reconstruction
This procedure is required if there is a damage to the bone chain of the middle ear. Commonly affected bone is the long process of incus, where it gets necrosed. The bone chain can be repaired using autograft of incus or cartilage. Prosthetic implants made of hydroxyapatite or teflon are also used.

Surgical approach

Tympanoplasty can be performed through the ear canal (transcanal approach), through an incision in the ear (endaural approach) or through an incision behind the ear (postauricular approach). A graft may be taken to reconstruct the tympanic membrane. Common graft sites include the temporalis fascia and the tragus. It is done under local or general anesthesia. It is done on an inpatient or day case basis and is successful 85–90% of the time.

History

The first recorded attempt at repairing the tympanic membrane was made by Marcus Banzer in 1640 using an ivory tube covered by pig's bladder.

Artificial tympanic membranes
In the middle of the nineteenth century the British otologists James Yearsley and Joseph Toynbee each developed their own form of artificial eardrum. Despite initial enthusiasm for these devices, experience amongst the medical profession over the following half century demonstrated their minimal value in the treatment of a perforated eardrum, which generally heals naturally.

See also
 Eardrum
 Tympanostomy tube
 Myringoplasty
 Myringotomy

References

External links
 Ruptured eardrum: Treatment - MayoClinic.com

Auditory system
Ear surgery